Simone Kuhn (born 2 September 1980, in Wattwil) is a female professional beach volleyball player from Switzerland, who represented her native country at the beach volleyball tournaments of the 2004 Summer Olympics in Athens, Greece, the 2008 Summer Olympics in Beijing and the 2012 Summer Olympics in London. In 2004, she partnered with Nicole Schnyder and lost all three pool matches. In 2008, she played alongside Lea Schwer and again lost all pool matches. In 2012, she partnered with Nadine Zumkehr and the pair reached the round of 16 where they were eliminated by the American pair of Jennifer Kessy and April Ross who went on to win silver.

Partnering Nicole Schnyder-Benoit she claimed the gold medal at the 2004 European Championships in Timmendorfer Strand, Germany.

Playing partners
 Lea Schwer
 Nicole Schnyder-Benoit
 Annik Skrivan
 Nadine Zumkehr

Sponsors
 Swatch

References

1980 births
Living people
Swiss beach volleyball players
Women's beach volleyball players
Beach volleyball players at the 2004 Summer Olympics
Beach volleyball players at the 2008 Summer Olympics
Beach volleyball players at the 2012 Summer Olympics
Olympic beach volleyball players of Switzerland